Ready or Not is a live album by the rock band the Grateful Dead.  It contains nine songs recorded at various venues from 1992 to 1995.  It was released on November 22, 2019 in LP and CD format.

Unfinished Grateful Dead album 

In February 1992, the Grateful Dead began work on recording a new studio album.  That album was never completed, and the group disbanded in 1995 following the death of Jerry Garcia.  Most likely the unfinished studio album would have included the songs that appear on Ready or Not.

Critical reception 
On AllMusic, Fred Thomas wrote, "Ready or Not indeed offers a glimpse of what another studio album from what turned out to be the group's later phase would have sounded like, only with the buffer of comfort that comes from them working out the songs on-stage. It's a document not quite like any of the Dead's hundreds of other archival releases, zeroing in on unfamiliar and exciting material."

Track listing

Personnel 
Grateful Dead
Jerry Garcia – guitar, vocals
Bob Weir – guitar, vocals
Phil Lesh – bass, vocals
Bill Kreutzmann – drums
Mickey Hart – drums
Vince Welnick – keyboards, vocals
Production
Produced by Grateful Dead
Produced for release by David Lemieux
Associate Producers: Doran Tyson & Ivette Ramos
Recording: Dan Healy, John Cutler
Mastering: David Glasser
Cover art: Ruben Perez
Photos: Bob Minkin
Design: Steve Vance
Liner notes: Jesse Jarnow

Charts

References 

Grateful Dead live albums
Rhino Records live albums
2019 live albums